Bad Steve was a German heavy metal band, composed of former Accept members Jan Koemmet, Frank Friedrich and Dieter Rubach, as well as former members of more obscure bands Kanaan and Sin City. They supported Accept on a 1984 tour in Germany. Rubach later had a brief stint with Accept vocalist Udo Dirkschneider's band U.D.O. Koemmet had been with Accept previous to their recording career and re-entered that band briefly between their releases Breaker and Restless and Wild.

Discography
Bad Steve made one release, the 1985 album Killing the Night on Mausoleum Records.

Killing the Night (Mausoleum Records 1985)

Track listing
"Bad Steve is Coming"
"Light up my Soul"
"Killing the Night"
"Running to You"
"Inside Looking Out"
"Across the Rainbow"
"Living on the Frontline"
"Leather Girl"
"Nightbreaker"

Credits
Phillip Magoo (ex-Sin City) - vocals
Jan Koemmet (ex-Accept) - guitar
Accu Becker (ex-Kanaan) - guitar
Dieter Rubach (ex-Accept) - bass
Frank Friedrich (ex-Accept) - drums

References

Primary source
Record sleeve for Killing the Night

Other sources

External links
 Artist biography and a little bit about the band on Dieter Rubach's personal website

German heavy metal musical groups